Platte Island or Île Platte is an island in the Southern Coral Group that is part of the Outer Islands of the Seychelles.

Geography 
Coëtivy Island (also Southern Coral Group) lies  further southeast.

Its height is 3 m above the sea level.

History 
Platte was discovered and named in 1769 for its low topography by Lieutenant de Lampériaire of La Curieuse. And it also known by its nickname ″ill Pllate″.

In the 1840s there was sufficient guano on the island to make it worthwhile excavating, and it was still won in the 20th century. A visitor in 1905 stated that 1500 tons had been taken off the island the month before he arrived. He also reported on the island's “beautiful plantation of coconuts which yields about 20,000 a month,” the fine condition of the palms presumably due to the guano rich soil. The island was not always so productive. In 1864 the Great Britain Civil Commissioner complained that “despite 18 years’ occupation only 17 coconut trees have been planted”.

In 1828 Platte was proposed as a suitable location for an isolation camp for leprosy sufferers, but in 1838 the island was taken over by the British administration for use as a quarantine station for visiting ships instead. It did not prove entirely satisfactory. Being at some distance from authority, the crews of the ships, in particular the whalers, tended to amok, causing “depredations”. By 1864 the Civil Commissioner had further complaints about the use of Platte as a quarantine island. He did not think it ”of much potential utility because it is 71 miles from Mahé and vessels of 500 tons burden cannot approach nearer than 5 miles because of the dangerous reef. Also during the SE monsoon it is almost inaccessible to any vessel”. He was dubious as to the possibility of building any infrastructure on the island because “an erection on Flat Island would be…expensive – it is entirely coral with no timber, trees having been removed to plant coconuts…The only house is a hut constructed of leaves. No provisions except for fish are available. There is sufficient dead wood to burn lime and there is coral for building but all labourers and rations would have to come from Mahé at great expense”. He noted that the last time a ship was put in quarantine, Long Island was actually used, but his preference was to use Moyenne Island as the quarantine station.

Coral reefs
Within the barrier reefs, the lagoon is quite smooth, and landing is safe and easy.

There are two tricky passages through the reef on the northwest side, available only for small vessels with local knowledge only. Depths of less than  can exist on this reef where breakers have been observed.

Demographics
There is a small settlement on the western shore with the manager's house and a few guest cottages to the northwest. There is also an abandoned Church and abandoned hospital. The Island Development Company (IDC) plans to build a hotel instead of the guesthouses

Administration
Platte island is administered by the Island Development Company (IDC). Due to its small population, there are no government buildings or services. Many services are only provided in the Seychelles' capital Victoria, which is difficult to reach. Workers have to undergo a medical examination before coming to the Island to prove their physical ability to stay there for a longer term without quick access to health care. The IDC replenishes all consumption goods needed by Platte island every three month, e.g. food, fuel, medicine, and working equipment.

Transport
Platte island is bisected by a 1000 m airfield that follows the long north–south axis, 23 m wide east–west, and 3 m above the sea level. The island is occasionally serviced by an Island Development Company (IDC) aircraft from Mahé.

Platte Island also has a jetty 3 m deep that a landing craft of 400-500 t can reach at a minimum tide of 1.5 m.

Economics
The inhabitants on the island are engaged in very small scale farming and fishing activities mainly for self-supply as of 2004. An plan proposed by IDC for Platte's development in the future involves a mixture of tourism, fishery, agriculture, building development and conservation.

Flora and fauna
The island is known for its rich fish life. The red-footed booby and sooty tern used to breed there but are now extinct. The brown noddy and white-tailed tropicbird still breed while hundreds of lesser noddies and bridled terns roost at night. Barn owls were introduced in 1949 but died out in 1951–1952. The red fody also breeds on the island. A year-long turtle study conducted in 1998 demonstrated that Platte has significant populations of some 40 female hawksbill sea turtles nesting annually.

Image gallery

References

External links 

 Island guide 1
 Island guide 2
 National Bureau of Statistics
 Info on the island
 Gallery

Platte, Ile